Nourredine El Ouardani (born 4 January 1978) is a French football manager who is the current head coach of French club Tours.

Career
Nourredine El Ouardani was born in Sartène on 4 January 1978. A former amateur football player-manager, El Ouardani was appointed as caretaker manager of last place Tours FC near the end of the 2016–17 Ligue 2 season. He led the club through a run of six league matches without defeat, saving Tours from relegation.

On 1 July 2019 he was appointed as manager of Tours.

Personal life
He holds French and Moroccan nationalities.

References

1978 births
Living people
French football managers
French people of Moroccan descent
Tours FC managers

Sportspeople from Corse-du-Sud

[1] https://m.footballdatabase.eu/en/player/details/315496-nourredine-el_ouardani